Newtown Public Schools is a school district in Fairfield County, Connecticut, United States.  it contained seven schools, with a total enrollment of 5298, an increase of  since 1994. It comprises 2.64% of Fairfield County (0.53% of the state). Teachers in the school district are paid more than average for the area, which has in the past led to complaints from neighboring districts of staff being poached from them.

In 2012, the district's Sandy Hook elementary school became the scene of the second deadliest school shooting in U.S history when Adam Lanza shot and killed 26 people, 20 of which were children 6 and 7 years old.

History
The building that now houses Hawley School was built from donations to Newtown by Mary Elizabeth Hawley in 1921, and was named after her parents. It was a modern building for the time, having central heating, an auditorium, a chemistry laboratory, and fireproofing; however, it lacks modern facilities with respect to other schools in the district, such as central air conditioning. By 1950, the school had become so overcrowded that an extension was built at the rear of the building and some of the old one-room schoolhouses were re-opened. The Newtown High School was located in this building from 1921 to 1953, when it was moved to a new building on Queen Street. The Hawley building was re-used as an elementary school, serving kindergarten to grade 8. The high school moved from Queen Street in 1970, and the Queen Street building became what is today Newtown Middle School, with the Hawley elementary school reduced to serving kindergarten to grade 4.

The playground facilities used by Hawley School were once the Newtown Fairgrounds. They became Taylor Field, owned by Cornelius Byron Taylor, who donated the field to the town at the same time as Hawley donated the building.

On May 10, 2013, a task force voted unanimously to demolish the existing Sandy Hook elementary school and construct a new school on the existing site.

2012 school shooting 

On December 14, 2012, Adam Lanza shot his mother at home, then killed 26 people (20 children and 6 staff) and himself at Sandy Hook Elementary School. It was the fourth-deadliest mass shooting in U.S. history. It was also the second-deadliest school shooting in U.S. history, after the Virginia Tech shooting, and the deadliest at any U.S. elementary school.

Sandy Hook Elementary did not reopen after the shooting; the school's student body moved to the then-closed Chalk Hill Middle School in nearby Monroe on January 3, 2013. Donna Page, the school's former principal, became the interim principal, telling parents it was her "calling" to return after the tragedy. She was the principal for 14 years before retiring in 2010.

Many residents of Newtown expressed support for turning the site of the shooting at the former Sandy Hook Elementary School building into a memorial.

The town decided the most appropriate course of action would be to tear down the old school and build a new school on the same site. Demolition took place in October and November 2013.  The demolition of the school was highly guarded and workers were required to sign confidentiality agreements to protect the victims and their families. The town accepted a state grant of $49.3 million to cover the costs of the demolition and construction. The new school opened on August 29, 2016.

Schools

See also 

 List of school districts in Connecticut

Notes

References

Reference bibliography

Further reading
 

School districts in Connecticut
Education in Fairfield County, Connecticut
Newtown, Connecticut